Balaban is a village on the hillside of Kartepe Mountain near İzmit, Kocaeli Province, Turkey.

Geography 
Balaban, located in the Kocaeli Region's Samanlı Mountain range, on the slopes of Kartepe mountain. It is at the south side of the city of İzmit, Kocaeli Province, on the hillside of Kartepe Mountain between Büyük Derbent and Suadiye towns. It is 24 km from the center of city and 2.5 km from the nearest town, Büyük Derbent.

History 
The first settlements date back to ancient times. There are only some materials founded on the village area from Astakos from 712 BCE and also as the inhabitants called as Subaşı area, there are some tunnels and cisterns founded supposedly belonged to Byzantine Empire periods.

Also on the farm place at east side of village, as inhabitants call Taşlı Tarla (en: stony field) there are many materials founded like a piece of valve, keramik pots etc. As a folk story, they belong to "missing mountain" where was overthrown at the big earthquake which happens every 100 years around İzmit on a civilization living there. But its origins are still unknown and there is no academic research about them yet.

Very well known story of Balaban began at the first quarter of the 19th century.  Balaban's area known as "Balaban's ranch" where was about 5000 m² (1000 m²=1/4 acre).  At that time a Muslim judge Fevzi Efendi bought these all ranch, and brought his family living in Batum in the Russo-Turkish War (1877–1878).  With this big migration until 1880, they began to settle down around the area and they created today's Balaban Village.

Economy 

The hills and lower sides of Kartepe mountain (1606 m) is very well formed for farming. Inhabitants mostly growing-selling fruits or living there as summer place.  "Balaban's Cherry" is very famous, there are many cheery trees in all gardens, but also apple, pear, chestnut, walnut trees are growing too. Stockbreeding is very low, growing vegetables are just for themselves.

After 1995, an American couple began to build Kartepe Ski Establishment and Hotel, Balaban turned it faces to tourism and also many summer sites built low side of the mountain. Around that time Kocaeli University Tourism and Career Academy was founded in Büyük Derbent with its career hotel that brings tourism activity to the area. Anyhow, hillsides of the mountain are still virgin, inhabitants keep caring for the area included the historical places and forest, but the lower side is totally different now from it was 10 years ago.

References

External links

 Flash movie for Balaban

Villages in Kartepe District